Gillum is both a surname and a given name. Notable people with the name include:

Surname
Andrew Gillum (born 1979), American politician of the Democratic Party who served as the Mayor of Tallahassee until 2018
Gerald Earl Gillum (born 1989), better known by his stage name G-Eazy, American rapper and record producer from Oakland, California
Jazz Gillum (1902 or 1904–1966), American blues harmonica player
Vern Gillum, American television director

Given name
Gillum Baley (1813–1895), American pioneer and judge